Radovan Tariska (born August 14, 1979) is a Slovak jazz saxophonist.

Biography
Radovan Tariska was born in Levice, Slovakia on August 14, 1979. He started to play music at the age of 5, after being encouraged by his grandfather, who played saxophone and clarinet. At the age of 12, Radovan started to study clarinet at Primary art school in Tlmace. He is a 1998 graduate of Conservatory of Zilina, where he studied alto saxophone. As a member of The Slovak Young Swing Generation Big Band, he performed at Bratislava Jazz Days festival in 1997.

Radovan has been a member of Gustav Brom Big Band since 2001. In 2002 he was honoured with a prize The Jazzman of the Year by the Slovak Jazz Society for his outstanding instrumental performance.

In 2006, Radovan recorded Elements, his first album as a bandleader, for the Music Centre label as a duo with a pianist Ondrej Krajnak. This album was nominated for a Slovak Music Award as the jazz album of the year.
 
In 2005 he put together an international sextet with Ryan Carniaux (trumpet, US), Ondrej Stveracek (tenor saxophone, Czech Republic), Ondrej Krajnak (piano, Slovakia), Tomas Baros (double bass, Czech Republic), Marian Sevcik (drums, Slovakia). With his international sextet, he released his second album, Radovan Tariska Sextet, in 2009 on the Music Centre label.

Radovan is well known for his latest project Folklore To Jazz. He created a unique combination of Slovak traditional folklore with American Jazz. Folklore To Jazz is a successful multicultural project, in which Radovan involved some of the most successful jazz musicians of today: Essiet Okon Essiet (bass), Benito Gonzalez(piano), David Hodek (drums). In 2013, the album Folklore to Jazz was nominated for Radiohead Award and Esprit Award as the best jazz album of the year.

In 2015, Radovan Tariska was nominated for the Crystal Wing Awards.

Discography

As Leader
Elementy (Hudobne centrum, 2006)
Radovan Tariska Sextet (Hudobne centrum, 2009)
Folklore to Jazz (Hunnia Records & Film Production, 2013)

As sideman
Peter Lipa: Beatles in Blue(s), (East West, 2002)
Gabo Jonáš Quartet: Live (Slovak Radio Records, 2002)
Miki Skuta: Identity (DS Consult, 2002)
Libiaková Dáša: To nič (Allegro, 2002)
Matúš Jakabčic Quartet (2002)
Fuse Jazz: Labytint (Hudobny fond, 2003)
Hot House: Live (Hudobný fond, 2003)
Oskar Rózsa Sextet (Hevethia,2003)
Kabelková Žofie: Žiju (Indies Records, 2003)
Olga Škrancová: When I Fall in Love (Amplion Records, 2003)
Luboš Šrámek and His Five Reasons With Guests: Correspondance (Hudobný Fond, 2005)
Erik Rothenstein & his Rainbow Project: Prater Menuet (Hudobné centrum, 2005)
Pavol Bodnár & InterJAZZional Band: Ecce Jazz (Hevhetia, 2007)
Hanka Gregušvá: Reflections of my Sloul (Hudobny fond, 2007)
Matúš Jakabčic CZ/SK Big Band featuring Harry Sokal (Orf, 2007)
Juraj Bartoš: Hot House / Jazz na hradě (Multisonic, 2009)
Dávid Hodek Quartet: The First (Hudobné centrum, 2010)
Matúš Jakabčic CZ-SK Big Band (Multisonic, 2010)
Hanka Gregusova: Essence (Hevhetia, 2014)

References

External links

1979 births
Living people
Slovak musicians
Slovak composers
Male composers
People from Levice
Slovak male musicians